"Zombified" is a song by American rock band Falling in Reverse. It was released on January 5, 2022, through Epitaph Records. The song was released as the first single from the band's upcoming EP titled Neon Zombie. The song was again produced by DangerKids vocalist Tyler Smyth and Ronnie Radke.

Promotion and release
At the end of 2021, vocalist Ronnie Radke published images through Instagram that showed indication of an upcoming song. On January 4, 2022, the band announced on their social networks that there would be a live broadcast on Radke's Twitch channel the following day. The song was released on January 5, via live stream. It is the first single from their upcoming Neon Zombie EP.

Composition and lyrics
"Zombified" is a song written by Ronnie Radke, John Lundin, and Cody Quistad. The song's lyrics are a stand against cancel culture, wherein celebrities or popular online personalities get "cancelled" for certain actions, regardless of how long ago said actions were, and whether or not the offender had changed as a person. The song was composed by Ronnie Radke, unlike his previous singles, in this song Radke leaves the rap stage aside and begins to opt for a style closer to heavy metal without neglecting the breakdown and riffs that are not separate from post hardcore. About this single Ronnie explains why he wrote the song:

Music video
The music video for the song was directed by Jensen Noen who had already directed the band's music videos for other songs such as "Popular Monster", "The Drug in Me Is Reimagined", and "I'm Not a Vampire (Revamped)". The music video shows Falling in Reverse fending off against zombies in a post apocalyptic world. The music video won Best of Festival - Music Video at the 2022 Richmond International Film Festival.

In popular culture
Radke's partner and professional wrestler Saraya currently uses "Zombified" as her entrance music in All Elite Wrestling.

Personnel
Falling in Reverse
 Ronnie Radke – lead vocals, programming, producer, additional guitar
 Max Georgiev – lead guitar, backing vocals
 Christian Thompson – rhythm guitar, backing vocals
 Wes Horton – bass, backing vocals
Additional personnel
 Tyler Smyth – production, strings, additional writing, recording, mastering, programming, engineered
 Cody Quistad – additional writing, guitars
 Luke Holland – drums, percussion
 Jon Lundin – composition

Charts

Weekly charts

Year-end charts

See also
 List of Billboard Mainstream Rock number-one songs of the 2020s

References

2022 singles
2022 songs
Falling in Reverse songs
Songs written by Ronnie Radke
Epitaph Records singles